Newport Corporation Tramways operated a tramway service in Newport between 1894 and 1937.

History
Newport Corporation took over the Newport Tramways Company on 30 July 1894. The company was then leased back to Solomon Andrews to continue the service.

The first electric services started on 9 April 1903. The trams sported a livery of Maroon and Cream.

Closure

The final tram ran on 5 September 1937.

References

History of Newport, Wales
Transport in Newport, Wales
Tram transport in Wales
3 ft 6 in gauge railways in Wales
1937 disestablishments in Wales